Damian Patrick George Hinds (born 27 November 1969) is a British politician serving as Minister of State for Prisons, Parole and Probation since October 2022. He served as Secretary of State for Education from 2018 to 2019 and Minister of State for Security and Borders from 2021 to 2022. A member of the Conservative Party, he has been Member of Parliament (MP) for East Hampshire since 2010.

Hinds was educated at St Ambrose College and Trinity College, Oxford. He was elected for East Hampshire at the 2010 general election.

Hinds was appointed Exchequer Secretary to the Treasury in 2015. He was moved to the post of minister of state for employment in 2016. In the 2018 cabinet reshuffle he was promoted to Secretary of State for Education. He lost this position following Boris Johnson's appointment as Prime Minister in 2019. He returned to government in 2021 as Minister of State for Security. He resigned on 7 July 2022.

Early life and career
Hinds was educated at St Ambrose College, a voluntary aided Roman Catholic grammar school in Hale Barns, Greater Manchester.

Hinds read Philosophy, Politics and Economics at Trinity College, University of Oxford, attaining a first class degree. He served as President of the Oxford Union.

He stood in Stretford and Urmston at the 2005 general election, coming second to incumbent MP Beverley Hughes, gaining 30.4% of the vote (an increase for the Conservative Party of 3.3%).

Before becoming an MP, Hinds spent 18 years working in the pubs/brewing and hotel industries, in Britain and abroad.

Hinds was chairman of the Bow Group in 2001–02.

Parliamentary career
At the 2010 general election, Hinds was elected Member of Parliament for East Hampshire, getting 56.8% of the vote (an increase of 9.7%) and achieving a swing from the Liberal Democrats to the Conservative Party of 6.6%. The previous Conservative MP, Michael Mates, had stood down at the election.

Hinds sat on the Education Select Committee between 2010 and 2012. He was also a member of the Public Bill Committee for the Defence Reform Act 2014.

Hinds served as Exchequer Secretary to the Treasury from 12 May 2015.

In the run-up to the referendum of 2016, he campaigned in favour of the UK remaining in the European Union. He was made Minister of State for Employment by Prime Minister Theresa May on 17 July 2016.

In the 2018 cabinet reshuffle he was appointed as Secretary of State for Education, succeeding Justine Greening, who resigned rather than changing position.

Parliament lists Hinds' political interests as education, welfare, affordable credit, and social mobility. He has demonstrated a particular interest in the Catholic education sector and the admissions rules that apply to faith free schools.

During his tenure as Education Secretary Hinds introduced First Aid and CPR courses to school curriculums and launched a campaign to increase awareness of the importance of technical skills and apprenticeships' education.

Hinds lost his post as Education Secretary on 24 July 2019 following the appointment of Boris Johnson as Prime Minister.

Hinds returned to government on 13 August 2021 as Minister of State for Security following the resignation of James Brokenshire on health grounds. In a cabinet reshuffle on 15 September 2021 his ministerial title changed to Minister of State for Security and Borders. He resigned as minister on 7 July 2022, amid the July 2022 United Kingdom government crisis.

Personal life 
Hinds married Jacqui Morel, a teacher, on 11 August 2007.  They have three children.

Notes

References

External links

Conservative Home — Damian Hinds's selection
Petersfield Post — Damian Hinds's selection

|-

1969 births
Living people
UK MPs 2010–2015
Conservative Party (UK) MPs for English constituencies
People from Cheshire
Alumni of Trinity College, Oxford
Presidents of the Oxford Union
Members of the Bow Group
Members of the Privy Council of the United Kingdom
People educated at St. Ambrose College
UK MPs 2015–2017
UK MPs 2017–2019
UK MPs 2019–present